The Ceratomycetaceae are a family of fungi in the order Laboulbeniales. Taxa have a widespread distribution, and are epibiotic or parasitic on insect cuticles.

References

Laboulbeniomycetes
Ascomycota families